Elizabeth Alexandria Menzies was a temporary lecturer in History at the University College, Dundee (1952–1956) and the third woman to be awarded a Ph.D. in History from the University of St Andrews in 1954.   She attended the High School of Dundee.

Career 
Menzies began her academic career in June 1949 when she achieved an Honours M.A in History and English from the University of St Andrews. She then went on to begin a Ph.D. in October 1949 and was supported in her research by the Carnegie Scholarship from 1950 to 1952, which also assisted fellow notable female Ph.D. students Edith MacQueen and Edith Thomson. Her thesis, published a quarter of a century after the first two women Ph.Ds., was entitled "A study of Anglo-Scottish relations, 1637-43" and her supervisor was Sir Charles Ogilvie. Menzies also held a University Fellowship of the Institute of Historical Research, London, during this time.

Menzies held a position as a temporary lecturer within the Department of History at University College, Dundee from 1952 to 1956. Within her cohort of seminal female Ph.D. candidates, Menzies appears to be the only woman to be engaged in a teaching position whilst also working towards her Ph.D.

References

Academics of the University of Dundee
People educated at the High School of Dundee
Alumni of the University of St Andrews
20th-century British historians
Possibly living people
Year of birth missing
Place of birth missing
Nationality missing
British women historians